The 2013–14 North of Scotland Cup began on  and ended on , when eventual winners, Brora Rangers, defeated defending champions Nairn County 3–0 at Clachnacuddin's Grant Street Park in Inverness. It was sponsored by AJG Parcels for the second year.

2013-14 competing clubs

Scottish Professional Football League
Inverness Caledonian Thistle

Highland Football League
Brora Rangers
Clachnacuddin
Forres Mechanics
Fort William
Lossiemouth
Nairn County
Rothes
Strathspey Thistle
Wick Academy

North Caledonian Football League
Golspie Sutherland
Halkirk United
Muir of Ord Rovers
Thurso

First round

Second round

Semi finals

Final

References 

North of Scotland Cup seasons
North of Scotland Cup